Vladimir Pavlovich Titov (— ), better known under the pseudonym Tit Kosmokratov, was a Russian writer, statesman, diplomat. As a writer he is best known for the novella The Remote House on Vasilyevsky Island (Уединённый домик на Васильевском), which was influenced by the writings of Aleksandr Pushkin.

Biography 

graduated at the Moscow University Noble Boarding School and the Moscow State University. He trained with well-known writers Vladimir Odoevsky and Stepan Shevyryov. From 1823 to 1828 he served at the chancery of the Ministry of Foreign Affairs, then in the Asian department.

In his youth he was active in literature. With Odoevsky, Shevyryov, Dmitry Venevitinov and others he participated at the philosophical circle Lyubomudry, which existed from 1823 to 1825. He knew Pushkin, Pyotr Vyazemsky, Vasily Zhukovsky and many more of the leading writers. His fantastic novella The Remote House on Vasilyevsky Island was published in the almanach The Northern Flowers of 1829 (Северные цветы на 1829). As Tit Kosmokratov he also wrote The Monastery of St. Brigit (Монастырь св. Бригиты), issued in the almanach The Northern Flowers of 1829. Also, Titov is the author of the three-volume novel about the Russo-Turkish War from 1828 to 1829, Wrongly Stories of Cicerone del K...o (Неправдоподобные рассказы чичероне дель К…о) (1837).

Titov later served as General-Councilor of the Danubian Principalities, and was an envoy to Constantinople and Stuttgart. From 1873 he commissioned the Archaeographic Commission.

References 

 Bikerman, I., "Пушкинские заметки. Кто такой Вершнев?": Пушкин и его современники, pp. 19–20, St. Petersburg, 1914
 Chereysky, L. A. Титов В. П. // Черейский Л. А. Пушкин и его окружение, 2nd edition. Leningrad, 1989.
 Chertkov, L. N. Титов В. П. // Concise Literary Encyclopedia, Moscow, 1962—1978, volume 7, 1972.

1807 births
1891 deaths
People from Spassky District, Ryazan Oblast
People from Ryazan Governorate
Russian writers
Russian diplomats
Moscow State University alumni
Ambassadors of the Russian Empire to the Ottoman Empire